Stages: Performances 1970–2002 is a box set by Neil Diamond that was released by Columbia Records in 2003. The set consists of five compact discs of concert recordings plus a DVD containing live recordings plus a documentary.

The first two CDs of the set, "A Night in Las Vegas", are drawn from Diamond's December 27, 2002, performance at MGM Grand Garden Arena. The third and fourth CDs consist of material recorded between 1970 (the same version of the song "Lordy" appears on Diamond's 1970 album Gold) and 2001 in North America, the United Kingdom, Ireland, Australia and Germany. The fifth CD is devoted to Christmas music. The DVD features Diamond's July 2002 show in Dublin plus a documentary "Welcome to Diamondville". Stages reached position number 137 on the Billboard 200 chart.

Allmusic critic Thom Jurek gave the collection a negative review, stating:
This is a job shoddily and, yes, very cynically done. Where Hot August Night and Hot August Night II were real occasions to celebrate Diamond's mind-blowing live potential, Stages is really just a marketing ploy to get fans, the people who should be rewarded, to shell out more of their hard-earned dollars for considerably less aesthetically.

Compact disc track listing

DVD track listing
"America"
"Hello Again"
"Solitary Man"
"I'm a Believer"
"September Morn"
"Beautiful Noise"
"Girl, You'll Be a Woman Soon"
"Sweet Caroline"
"Sweet Caroline" 
"I Am... I Said"
"Cracklin' Rosie"
"Brother Love's Traveling Salvation Show"
Backstage:"Welcome to Diamondville"

References

2003 albums
Columbia Records albums
Neil Diamond compilation albums
Neil Diamond live albums